Tenkamenin may refer to:

 Tha Realest (rapper)
 Tunka Manin, ancient king of Ghana